Əhmədli is a village and municipality in the Shamakhi District of Azerbaijan. It has a population of 502.

References 

Populated places in Shamakhi District